In the mathematical fields of set theory and extremal combinatorics, a sunflower or -system is a collection of sets whose pairwise intersection is constant. This constant intersection is called the kernel of the sunflower.

The main research question arising in relation to sunflowers is: under what conditions does there exist a large sunflower (a sunflower with many sets) in a given collection of sets? The -lemma, sunflower lemma, and the Erdős-Rado sunflower conjecture give successively weaker conditions which would imply the existence of a large sunflower in a given collection, with the latter being one of the most famous open problems of extremal combinatorics.

Formal definition 

Note that this intersection, may be empty; a collection of pairwise disjoint subsets is also a sunflower. Similarly, a collection of sets each containing the same elements is also trivially a sunflower.

Sunflower lemma and conjecture 

The study of sunflowers generally focuses on when set systems contain sunflowers, in particular, when a set system is sufficiently large to necessarily contain a sunflower.

Specifically, researchers analyze the function  for nonnegative integers , which is defined to be the smallest nonnegative integer  such that, for any set system  such that every set  has cardinality at most , if  has more than  sets, then  contains a sunflower of  sets. Though it is not clear that such an  must exist, a basic and simple result of Erdős and Rado, the Delta System Theorem, indicates that it does.

Erdos-Rado Delta System Theorem:

By adding dummy elements, it suffices to only consider set systems  such that every set in  has cardinality , so often the sunflower lemma is equivalently phrased as holding for "-uniform" set systems.

Sunflower lemma 

 proved the sunflower lemma, which states that

The Erdős-Rado sunflower lemma can be proved directly through induction. First, since the set system  must be a collection of distinct sets of size one, and so  of these sets make a sunflower. In the general case, suppose  has no sunflower with  sets. Then consider  to be a maximal collection of pairwise disjoint sets (that is,  is the empty set unless , and every set in  intersects with some ). Because we assumed that  had no sunflower of size , and a collection of pairwise disjoint sets is a sunflower, .

Let .

Then  is a set system, like , except that every element of  has  elements.

Hence, if , then  contains an  set sunflower of size  sets. Hence,  and the theorem follows.

Erdős-Rado sunflower conjecture

Sunflower lower bounds

Theorem. 

Proof.
For  a set of  sequence of distinct elements is not a sunflower.
Let  denote the size of the largest set of -sets with no  sunflower. Let  be such a set. Take the union of the  disjoint copies with the elements added and denote this set . We have that,.  is sunflower free since any selection of  sets if in one of the disjoint partitions is sunflower free by assumption of H being sunflower free. Otherwise, if  sets are selected from across multiple sets of the partition, then two must be selected from one partition since there are only  partitions. This implies that at least two sets and not all the sets will have an element in common. Hence this is not a sunflower of  sets.

A stronger result is the following theorem:

Theorem. 

Proof. Let  and  be two sunflower free families. Denote this family of sets . This produces a family of  sets which is sunflower free.

It is also known that .

Applications of the sunflower lemma

The sunflower lemma has numerous applications in theoretical computer science. For example, in 1986, Razborov used the sunflower lemma to prove that the Clique language required  (superpolynomial) size monotone circuits, a breakthrough result in circuit complexity theory at the time. Håstad, Jukna, and Pudlák used it to prove lower bounds on depth-  circuits. It has also been applied in the parameterized complexity of the hitting set problem, to design fixed-parameter tractable algorithms for finding small sets of elements that contain at least one element from a given family of sets.

Analogue for infinite collections of sets
A version of the -lemma which is essentially equivalent to the Erdős-Rado -system theorem states that a countable collection of k-sets contains a countably infinite sunflower or -system.

The -lemma states that every uncountable collection of finite sets contains an uncountable -system.

The -lemma is a combinatorial set-theoretic tool used in proofs to impose an upper bound on the size of a collection of pairwise incompatible elements in a forcing poset. It may for example be used as one of the ingredients in a proof showing that it is consistent with Zermelo–Fraenkel set theory that the continuum hypothesis does not hold.

Let  enumerate . For , let 
.
Build  of cardinality  such that whenever  are in  then .

See also
Cap set

References

External links
 Thiemann, René. The Sunflower Lemma of Erdős and Rado (Formal proof development in Isabelle/HOL, Archive of Formal Proofs)

Notes 

Forcing (mathematics)
Set theory
Intersection
Combinatorics